The 2010–11 season is Feyenoord's fifty-fifth consecutive season in the Dutch Eredivisie. This season, Feyenoord competes in three competitions; the Eredivisie, the KNVB Cup and the Europa League.

Competitions

Overall

Eredivisie

League table

Results summary

Results by round

Matches

KNVB Cup

Europa League

Friendlies

Guadiana Trophy

As part of the pre-season preparations, Feyenoord participated in the Guadiana Trophy. All matches were played at the Complexo Desportivo de Vila Real de Santo António in Vila Real de Santo António, Portugal. As there were only three teams in this year's edition of the Guadiana Trophy, a penalty shootout was carried out at the end of each fixture to make sure that a clear winner could be selected. Feyenoord lost both matches against Aston Villa and Benfica and finished on the last third place in the tournament.

Players

First team squad
Feyenoord's first team squad for the season 2010–11 consists of three goalkeepers and 23 field players. In total, eleven academy graduates are part of the first team squad.

Transfers

Summer transfer window

In:

Out:

Winter transfer window

In:

Out:

Out on loan

References

Feyenoord seasons
Feyenoord